John Wesley Mayhew (October 2, 1885 – September 30, 1941) was an American football player and coach of football, basketball, and baseball coach. He played college football at Brown University from 1906 to 1908 and was named an All-American in 1906 playing as a halfback. He also played baseball and ran track at Brown. Mayhew served as the head football coach at Louisiana State University (LSU) from 1909 to 1910, compiling a record of 3–6. He took over for Joe Pritchard in the middle of the 1909 season. Mayhew was also the head coach of the LSU basketball team from 1909 to 1911, head coach of the LSU baseball team from 1910 to 1911 and head coach of the LSU track and field team. 

Mayhew was born on October 2, 1885, in Chilmark, Massachusetts. He graduated from the Worcester Academy in 1904 and from Brown University in 1909. He on September 30, 1941, in Pocasset, Massachusetts .

Head coaching record

Football

*First 5 games were coached by Joe Pritchard.

Basketball

Baseball

References

1885 births
1941 deaths
All-American college football players
American football halfbacks
Brown Bears baseball players
Brown Bears football players
Brown Bears men's track and field athletes
College men's basketball head coaches in the United States
LSU Tigers baseball coaches
LSU Tigers basketball coaches
LSU Tigers football coaches
LSU Tigers and Lady Tigers track and field coaches
Worcester Academy alumni
People from Chilmark, Massachusetts
Players of American football from Massachusetts
Coaches of American football from Massachusetts
Baseball coaches from Massachusetts
Basketball coaches from Massachusetts